The Yuruna languages (or Jurúna languages) of Brazil form a branch of the Tupian language family.

They are Jurúna, Maritsauá, and Xipaya.

Varieties
Below is a list of Yuruna language varieties listed by Loukotka (1968), including names of unattested varieties.

Yuruna / Paru-podeari - spoken on the middle course of the Xingú River.
Arupai / Urupaya - once spoken on the Xingú River south of the Yuruna tribe. (Unattested.)
Shipaya / Achipaya / Jacipoya - once spoken on the Iriri River and Curua River, now probably extinct.
Manitsauá / Mantizula - spoken in a single village on the Manissauá-Miçu River, tributary of the Xingú River.

The  lists Yudja and the extinct Arupaia (Arupai), Xipaia, Peapaia, Aoku (not identified), and Maritsawá.

References

Tupian languages